The Old Forge Farm, also known as Surveyor's Last Shift, is a historic home located at Hagerstown, Washington County, Maryland, United States. It is a two-story, three bay fieldstone dwelling built in 1762, with a long, two-story, five bay addition. The house features a slate roof.  Also on the property are a stone end barn and stone shed, and a stone tenant house.

The Old Forge Farm was listed on the National Register of Historic Places in 1979.

They also breed Barbados Blackbelly sheep registered with the BBSAI.

References

External links
, including photo from 2000, at Maryland Historical Trust

Farms on the National Register of Historic Places in Maryland
Houses in Hagerstown, Maryland
Houses completed in 1762
National Register of Historic Places in Washington County, Maryland